Hubert H. Bryant (January 4, 1931 – December 25, 2016) was an American attorney who served as the United States Attorney for the Northern District of Oklahoma from 1977 to 1981.

He died on December 25, 2016, in Tulsa, Oklahoma at age 85.

References

1931 births
2016 deaths
United States Attorneys for the Northern District of Oklahoma
Oklahoma Democrats